Zhongcun is a Yao ethnic township located in the south of Yanling County, Hunan, China. As of the end of 2015, it had a population of 13,400. Its administrative centre is at the village of Zhongcun.

History
As a division of Yanling County,  historically Zhongcun was part of the 3rd county-controlled district in 1949, the 6th county controlled district in 1952. The name of Zhongcun Township appeared in 1956.  In 1958, Zhongcun Township was reorganized as a commune named Xingfu and then renamed to Zhongcun Commune, Longzha Yao Ethnic Township was merged to Zhongcun and reorganized as a production brigade of Longzha. Zhongcun was reorganized as a township in 1984. Dividing four villages in southern Zhongcun Township, Longzha Yao Ethnic Township was re-established in February 1985. On November 20, 2015, merging Zhongcun Township, Longzha Yao Ethnic Township and Pingle Township, the new Zhongcun Yao Ethnic Township was created.

Subdivisions
It is divided into 10 villages: Zhong Village, Longtan Village, Shendu Village, Luofujiang Village, Daoren Village, Lianxi Village, Longping Village, Xintian Village, Meigang Village, and Jiutan Village.

External links
 official website

References

Divisions of Yanling County
Yao ethnic townships